"Get Down, Get Down (Get on the Floor)" is a song written by Joe Simon and Raeford Gerald. It was recorded and released as single by Simon in 1975 with both Simon and Gerald serving as producers. It was the last of Simon's three number ones on the soul chart and his highest entry on the Billboard Hot 100 chart, peaking at number eight. In Canada, the song reached number 15.

References

1975 singles
Joe Simon (musician) songs
1975 songs
Songs written by Joe Simon (musician)